Nick Price (born 1957) is a Zimbabwean professional golfer.

Nick or Nicholas Price may also refer to:

Nick Price (illustrator), British illustrator of The Wombles, Tumtum and Nutmeg, and Doctor Snuggles
Nick Price (actor), appearing in the Three Investigators film series
Nicholas Price (born 1983), backing drummer for Meg & Dia
Nicholas A. Price (born 1962), visual artist

See also 
Michael Price (disambiguation) (aka Mick Price)